is a multi-purpose stadium in Toyama, Japan. Built in 1992, it holds 30,000 people and is currently used mostly for baseball matches.

References

Baseball venues in Japan
Multi-purpose stadiums in Japan
Sports venues in Toyama Prefecture